Vijay Samuel Hazare  (11 March 1915 – 18 December 2004) was an Indian cricketer. He captained India in 14 matches between 1951 and 1953. In India's 25th Test match, nearly 20 years after India achieved Test status, he led India to its first ever Test cricket win (and the only victory under his captaincy) in 1951–52 against England at Madras, winning by an innings and eight runs in a match that began on the day that King George VI died.

Early life 

Hazare was born in Sangli,  into Marathi Christian family, in the then Bombay Presidency of British India in 1916, one of eight children of a school teacher.

Career 
Primarily a right-hand batsman, Hazare was also a right-hand medium-pace bowler.  A "shy, retiring" man (according to Wisden in 1952), it was widely thought that he was not a natural captain and that his batting suffered as a result.  His rival, Vijay Merchant said that the captaincy prevented Hazare from becoming India's finest batsman: "It was one of the tragedies of cricket."

Even so, Hazare's Test record is very respectable: he amassed 2,192 runs in 30 Test matches with a batting average of 47.65.  His first-class record is even more impressive, with a batting average of 58.38 for his 18,740 runs (highest first-class aggregate for an Indian player after Sunil Gavaskar, Sachin Tendulkar and Rahul Dravid).  He scored 60 first-class centuries (including 7 in Tests), the fourth highest for an Indian player and 10 first-class double centuries (including six during World War II, when India was the only Test cricket-playing country to continue holding its domestic first-class cricket competition without interruption).

His bowling record was more modest, and he took 595 first-class wickets (including 19 in Tests, and Donald Bradman's wicket three times) at a bowling average of 24.61.  On the Indian domestic circuit, Hazare played for the Maharashtra, Central India and Baroda teams.

Some of his notable achievements include:
First Indian batsman to score a triple century in first-class cricket (considering KS Duleepsinhji as an English cricketer)
First Indian to score two triple centuries:
the first, his highest score, was 316 not out for Maharashtra against Poona in 1939–40
the second was 309 out of 387 for The Rest against The Hindus at Bombay in 1943–44. Despite his innings, The Rest lost the match by an innings. It included a partnership of 300 with his brother, Vivek Hazare. Vijay scored 266 (88.6% of the partnership) of the 300 runs while Vivek contributed 21. Hazare scored 79.84% of his team's score, then a world record, and it is the second highest individual score in a losing cause. The Rest's total is the smallest completed innings to contain a triple century.
First Indian to score a century in each innings of a Test match (116 and 145 on successive days against Australia in Adelaide in 1947–48, which was the same team that became known as The Invincibles)
Against England at Kanpur in 1951–52, Hazare also became the first Indian batsman to score a pair (a duck in both innings)
First Indian player to score a century in three successive Test matches
First Indian player to make fifty centuries in his first class career
Highest partnership for any wicket in first-class cricket (577 runs with Gul Mahomed for Baroda against Holkar in the final of the Ranji Trophy at Baroda in 1947. This record stood for many years, and was only broken in 2006 by Kumar Sangakkara and Mahela Jayawardene who put on 624 for Sri Lanka against South Africa.
First Indian player to complete 1000 Test Runs

In retirement, he was for a short while an Indian Test cricket selector.  He has been honoured with a trophy in his name, the Vijay Hazare Trophy, a zonal-cricket tournament in India.  He died in December 2004 following prolonged illness caused by intestinal cancer.

He and Jasu Patel were the first cricketers to be honoured with the Padma Shri.

Domestic cricket 
Hazare was the leading run scorer of 1939-40 Ranji Trophy season. His team Maharashtra won its first title in that season, they defeated United Province cricket team in the final at Poona (Now Pune). In 1940-41 Ranji trophy he made 100 in the final and took 2 wickets. Maharashtra won the that season by defeating Madras cricket team in the final. Since that season Maharashtra not able to won Ranji trophy again.

Legacy 

 Board of Control for Cricket in India (BCCI) named its primer one-day domestic cricket championship after Hazare as, Vijay Hazare Trophy.

References

External links
Obituary, The Times, 20 December 2004, page 44
Cricinfo Player Profile : Vijay Samuel Hazare
rediff.com Factfile – Vijay Hazare
Vijay Hazare photos and articles
Former Indian captain Hazare dies (BBC, 18 December 2004)
Obituary (The Hindu, 19 December 2004)
Obituary (The Times, 20 December 2004)
Obituary (The Guardian, 20 December 2004)

India Test cricketers
Indian cricketers
India Test cricket captains
Baroda cricketers
Commonwealth XI cricketers
Central India cricketers
Maharashtra cricketers
West Zone cricketers
The Rest cricketers
Marathi people
Recipients of the Padma Shri in sports
People from Sangli
Deaths from colorectal cancer
1915 births
2004 deaths
India national cricket team selectors